The 2023 ReliaQuest Bowl was a college football bowl game played on January 2, 2023, at Raymond James Stadium in Tampa, Florida. The 37th annual ReliaQuest Bowl (previously known as the Outback Bowl from 1996 through 2022), the game featured the Mississippi State Bulldogs from the Southeastern Conference and the Illinois Fighting Illini from the Big Ten Conference. The game began at 12:03 p.m. EST and was aired on ESPN2. It was one of the 2022–23 bowl games concluding the 2022 FBS football season. Cybersecurity company ReliaQuest was the game's title sponsor.

Teams
Consistent with conference tie-ins, the game featured teams from the Big Ten Conference and the Southeastern Conference (SEC). The bowl also has a tie-in with the Atlantic Coast Conference (ACC) when the ACC's opponent in the Orange Bowl is a Big Ten team, in which case an ACC team is selected for the ReliaQuest Bowl.

This was the third meeting between the two teams; in their two prior matchups, Illinois won in 1923 and Mississippi State won in 1980.

Mississippi State Bulldogs

Mississippi State compiled an 8–4 record during the regular season, finishing with a 24–22 win over rival Ole Miss in the Egg Bowl. In five games against ranked opponents, the Bulldogs defeated Texas A&M and Ole Miss while losing to Kentucky, Alabama, and Georgia. The team was coached during the regular season by Mike Leach. Following Leach's death on December 12, Zach Arnett was elevated to head coach, including for the team's bowl game.

Illinois Fighting Illini

Illinois finished the regular season with an 8–4 record, losing three of their final four games. Their only contest against a ranked FBS opponent was a loss to Michigan.

Game summary

Statistics

 Tommy DeVito's receiving yardage occurred on the final play of the game, following an initial pass from DeVito to Casey Washington. After several laterals, DeVito fumbled the ball, which was returned by Mississippi State for a touchdown. Statbroadcast credits DeVito with -47 receiving yards, while ESPN credits DeVito with 13 receiving yards.

See also
 2022 Gasparilla Bowl, contested at the same venue on December 23

References

ReliaQuest Bowl
ReliaQuest Bowl
Mississippi State Bulldogs football bowl games
Illinois Fighting Illini football bowl games
ReliaQuest Bowl
ReliaQuest Bowl